List of the awards won by Mexican pop/rock band Maná.

Billboard Latin Music Awards
2000: Spirit of Hope
2003: Latin Rock Album of the Year: Revolución de Amor
2003: Latin Pop Album of the Year, Duo or Group: Revolución de Amor
2007: Latin Pop Airplay Song of the Year, Duo or Group: Labios Compartidos
2007: Latin Rock/Alternative Album of the Year: Amar es Combatir
2008: Latin Tour Of The Year: Amar es Combatir Tour
2009: Hot Latin Song of the Year Duo or Group: "Si No Te Hubieras Ido"
2009: Latin Pop Airplay Song of the Year, Duo or Group: "Si No Te Hubieras Ido"
2009: Latin Pop Album of the Year Duo or Group: Arde El Cielo
2009: Latin Rock/Alternative Album Of The Year: Arde El Cielo
2012: Latin Duet Or Group, Songs: Maná  
2012: Latin Duet Or Group, Album: Maná
2012: Latin Pop Duet Or Group of The Year, Songs: Maná
2012: Latin Pop Album Of The Year: Drama y Luz 
2012: Latin Pop Duet Or Group of Year, Album: Maná
2013: Spirit of Hope
2016: Latin Pop Duet Or Group of Year, Album: Maná
2016: Latin Pop Song of the Year: Mi Verdad
2016: Latin Pop Songs Artist of the Year: Maná
2016: Latin Pop Albums Artist of the Year: Maná
2018: Lifetime Achievement Award: Maná
2021: Icon Award: Maná
2022: Latin Pop Duo/Group of the Year: Maná

Grammy Awards
1999: Best Latin Rock/Alternative Performance for "Sueños Líquidos"
2003: Best Latin Rock/Alternative Album for  "Revolución de Amor"
2007: Best Latin Rock/Alternative Album for  "Amar es Combatir"
2012: Best Latin Pop, Rock or Urban Album for  "Drama y Luz"

Latin Grammy Awards
2000: Record of the Year for "Corazón Espinado" (with Santana)
2000: Best Pop Performance by a Duo or Group with Vocal for "Se Me Olvidó Otra Vez"
2000: Best Rock Performance by a Duo or Group for "Corazón Espinado" (with Santana)
2003: Best Rock Album by a Duo or Group for "Revolución de Amor"
2006: Special Award for musical accomplishments
2011: Best Rock Album for "Drama y Luz"
2011: Best Engineered Album for "Drama y Luz"
2015: Best Rock/Pop Album for "Cama Incendiada"
2018: Person of the Year

Los Premios 40 Principales
2007: Best Concert/Tour Amar es Combatir Tour
2011: Best Concert/Tour Drama y Luz World Tour

Los Premios Telehit
Los Premios Telehit 2011: Best Mexican Band International

MTV Video Music Awards Latin America
2006: Best Music Video for "Labios Compartidos"
2006: Best Rock Artist
2006: Lifetime Achievement Award
2007: Best Group or Duet
2007: Artist of the Year

Orgullosamente Latino
2007: Best Latino Video Award "Bendita Tu Luz" with Juan Luis Guerra

Premios Cadena Dial
2011: Premio Cadena Dial

Premios Casandra
2012: Premio Casandra Internacional

Premios People En Español Awards
2011: Best Album: Drama y Luz
2011: Best Rock Artist or Group

Premios Juventud
2006: Supernova Award
2007: Favorite Rock Artist
2008: Favorite Rock Artist
2009: Favorite Rock Artist
2011: Favorite Rock Artist
2012: Favorite Rock Artist

Premio Lo Nuestro
 1997: Pop Best Group
 1999: Pop Best Group
 1999: Pop Album of the Year Sueños Líquidos ( Along with Shakira album ¿Dónde Están los Ladrones? )
 2000: Pop Best Group
2003: Rock Album of the Year Revolución de Amor
2004: Pop Song of the Year "Mariposa Traicionera"
2005: Rock Album of the Year Essentiales: Luna
2007: Rock Artist of the Year
2007: Rock Album of the Year Amar es Combatir
2007: Rock Song of the Year "Labios Compartidos"
2008: Rock Artist of the Year
2008: Rock Song of the Year "Bendita Tu Luz" with Juan Luis Guerra
2011: Excellence Award
2012: Rock/Alternative Album of the Year Drama y Luz
2012: Rock/Alternative Artist of the Year

Premios Oye!
2002: Special Prizes: Social Prize to Music
2003: Album of the Year Revolución de Amor
2003: Best Solo or Group Artist
2004: Mexican Public Commercial Award
2007: MasterTone "Labios Compartidos"

Ritmo Latino Music Awards
1999: Best Solo or Rock Group Artist
2000: Album of the Year Maná MTV Unplugged
2003: Album of the Year Revolución de Amor

World Music Awards
2007: World's Best-Selling Latin Group
2007: Best Selling Latin American Artist

References

Awards
Lists of awards received by Mexican musician
Lists of awards received by musical group